William Peckover was a gunner in the Royal Navy and served on several vessels most notably commanded by James Cook and William Bligh.

He was born 17 June 1748, son of Daniel Peckover and Mary Avies in Aynho in the Cherwell Valley, Northamptonshire.

Early navy career 
Peckover joined Captain Cook's Endeavour expedition aged 21, on 25 July 1768 as an Able-bodied seaman. On the return to Britain, he petitioned Joseph Banks requesting to gain him a berth as a midshipman on Cook's next voyage. Peckover wrote "as you were so good to me During your last Voyage & so generous sinc your Return I am Determined to haxard my Life… I ham now Emboldend to solicit your Goodness to have me appointed Supernumery Midshipman in one of the Ships newly Commissioned for the South Seas". He was unsuccessful, but was appointed on 4 February 1772 as gunner's mate in Resolution. On Cook's third and final voyage (on the Discovery), which he joined on 16 February 1776, Peckover was appointed ships gunner.

Bounty voyage 
By the time Peckover was a crewmember on HMAV Bounty he was one of the most experienced on the vessel. He sailed on all three of Captain James Cook's pacific expeditions, had already visited Tahiti four times and was fluent in the Polynesian language. Bounty landed at Tahiti October 1788, where Bligh had Peckover supervise trading negotiations with the islanders while breadfruit plants were collected for transportation.

During the mutiny and subsequent events 
On 28 April 1789, during the return voyage to England, Peckover had been on watch duty from midnight to 4:00 am and was still asleep when Fletcher Christian seized control of the ship. Peckover was confined to his cabin during the mutiny, and not allowed up on deck until Bligh and his loyalists were being cast off the ship into the 23-foot launch. Peckover was able to smuggle off The Bounty a pocket watch and with this Bligh was able to navigate until 2 June 1788, when Bligh's log records "The Gunner when he left the ship brought his watch with him and had regulated our time until today when unfortunately I found it stopt".: to Coupang; the watch became corroded by the sea water and in appreciation Bligh gave Peckover a replacement. and had it inscribed "Wm Peckover H.M.S. Bounty 1788 Cap. Bligh"

Peckover survived the 3,500 nautical mile voyage in Bounty's launch to the Dutch East Indies port of Coupang on Timor and later during the mutineer's court martial in Britain, testified in favour of Midshipman Peter Heywood.

In July 1792, Commodore Pasley, (Peter Heywood's uncle) planned to contact Peckover, who at the time was living in Woolwich.  According to a footnote to the "Report of the Court Martial of Ten of the Mutineers", in May 1794, he was living at No. 13 Gun Alley, in Wapping, London.

Later navy career 
Peckover served on various ships during Britain's involvement in the American Revolution and Napoleonic Wars.

Royal Navy records state Peckover served as a gunner on the following vessels:

 30 Oct 1780 - HMS Dictator
 15 Jul 1782 - HMS Resistance
 11 Jun 1784 - HMS Recovery
 16 Dec 1784 - HMS Warspite
 27 Jan 1785 - HMS Amphitrite
 24 Aug 1787 - HMAV Bounty
 1 Dec 1790 - HMS Antelope
 6 Jun 1791 - HMS Sultan
 23 Jan 1792 - HMS Antelope
 6 Feb 1792 - HMS Ocean
 23 May 1798 - HMS Bedford
 30 Aug 1798 - HMS Irresistible
 14 May 1801 - HMS Gelykheid
Peckover applied for a position as gunner on HMS Providence (the second breadfruit expedition to Tahiti) but was refused by Bligh. In a letter to Sir Joseph Banks, 17 July 1791 (two weeks before departure), Bligh wrote:

‘‘Should Peckover my late Gunner ever trouble you to render him further services I shall esteem it a favour if you will tell him I informed you he was a vicious and worthless fellow – He applied to me to render him service & wanted to be appointed Gunner of the Providence but as I had determined never to suffer an officer who was with me in the Bounty to sail with again, it was for the cause I did not apply for him.’’

Bligh’s refusal to appoint Peckover was partly due to Edward Christian’s polemic testimony against Bligh in an effort to clear his brother’s name.  Christian states in his appendix:

"In the evidence of Mr. Peckover and Mr. Fryer, it is proved that Mr. Nelson the botanist said, upon hearing the commencement of the mutiny, "We know whose fault this is, or who is to blame, Mr. Fryer, what have we brought upon ourselves?" In addition to this, it ought to be known that Mr. Nelson, in conversation afterwards with an officer (Peckover) at Timor, who was speaking of returning with Captain Bligh if he got another ship, observed, "I am surprized that you should think of going a second time with (Bligh), (using a term of abuse), who has been the cause of all our losses."

The last known record of Peckover mentions him serving on HMS Gelykheid; he was superannuated on 10 June 1801; and is not mentioned any further in navy records. Gunner William Peckover, Gentleman of HMS Irresistible was created a Governor of the Chatham Chest.

National Archive records show that Peckover made provision in his pension for a widows pension: He was married to Sarah. Colchester Records Office show that Sarah Peckover was buried at Holy Trinity Church Colchester on 11 March 1819 aged 62 as was William Peckover a few months later on 16 May 1819 aged 70.

References

External links 
 A Voyage to the South Seas (William Bligh) Project Gutenberg
 Bounty crew list (Pacific Island Study Center)
 The Mutiny on the Bounty (Fateful Voyage)
 Testimony of William Peckover at Mutineers trial

Crew of HMS Bounty
18th-century Royal Navy personnel
1748 births